Hooper (or Hoopes) is a surname originating in England. It is derived from the archaic term for a person who aided in the building of barrels by creating the hoop for the barrel. Most Hoopers are English or of English descent. Notable individuals named Hooper include:

Austin Hooper (born 1994), American football player
Ben W. Hooper (1870–1957), governor of Tennessee 1911–1915
Carl Hooper (born 1966), West Indian cricket player
Charmaine Hooper (born 1968), Canadian soccer player
Chris Hooper (musician), Canadian musician with  the Grapes of Wrath
Chris Hooper (basketball) (born 1991), American basketball player
Claire Hooper (born 1976), Australian stand-up comedian, television and radio presenter and writer
Claire Hooper (artist) (born 1978), British artist
Craig Hooper (born 1959), Australian musician
Daniel Hooper aka Swampy (environmentalist) (born 1973), British environmental protester
David Vincent Hooper (1915–1998), British chess player and writer 
Dick Hooper (born 1956), Irish long-distance runner
Dudley Hooper (1911–1968), British accountant and early promoter of electronic data processing
Ed Hooper (born 1964), American author, journalist and historian
Edward W. Hooper (1839–1901), American Union Army officer and Harvard College treasurer
Edwin B. Hooper (1909–1986), Vice-Admiral of the United States Navy and Historian
Ellen Sturgis Hooper (1812–1848), American transcendentalist poet
Emma Hooper, Canadian author
Frances Hooper (1892–1986), American journalist, collector of arts and books, advertising executive
George Hooper (disambiguation), several people
Gloria Hooper, Baroness Hooper (born 1939), British politician
Gloria Hooper (athlete) (born 1992), Italian sprinter
Harry Hooper (1887–1974), American baseball player
Horace Everett Hooper (1859–1922), American publisher of Encyclopædia Britannica
Ibrahim Hooper, also known as Doug Hooper, American activist, spokesman for the Council on American-Islamic Relations (CAIR)
J. Robert Hooper (1936–2008), Maryland politician
Jack Hooper (intelligence officer), deputy director of the Canadian Security Intelligence Service
James Hooper (born 1987), British adventurer
James Thomas Hooper (1897–1971), British collector
Joe R. Hooper (1938–1979), American Medal of Honor awardee
JJ Hooper Jonathan James Hooper (born 1993), English footballer 
Jonathan S Hooper (born 1962), English painter
Joseph L. Hooper (1877–1934), U.S. Representative from Michigan
John Hooper (disambiguation), several people
Johnson J. Hooper (c. 1815 – 1863), American humorist
Kate Hooper (born 1978), Australian water polo player
Lance Hooper (born 1967), American NASCAR driver and team owner
Lora Hooper, American biologist
Lucy Hooper (1816–1841), American poet
Lucy Hamilton Hooper (1835–1893), American poet, journalist, editor, playwright
Lyndon Hooper (born 1966), Canadian soccer player
Melanie Hooper, Australian dancer
Mike Hooper (footballer) (born 1964), English footballer
Minnie Hooper (1876–1964), Australian ballet teacher
Nellee Hooper (born 1963), British producer/remixer for popular/rock music groups
Nicholas Hooper, English composer
Ofelia Hooper (1900–1981), Panamanian sociologist and poet
Pat Hooper (born 1952), Irish long-distance runner
Paul Hooper (born 1952), English clergyman, former Archdeacon of Leeds
Ralph Hooper (1926–2022), British aeronautical engineer
Selden G. Hooper (1904–1976), United States Navy admiral convicted by court-martial
Stanford Caldwell Hooper (1884–1955), U.S. Navy admiral and radio pioneer
Stuart Hooper (born 1981), English rugby union player
Tobe Hooper (1943–2017), American television and film director in horror films
Tom Hooper (ice hockey) (1883–1960), Canadian professional ice hockey player
Tom Hooper (director) (born 1972), British film and television director
Tom Hooper (musician), Canadian songwriter and musician
Tom Hooper (rugby union), Australian rugby union player
Tony Hooper (born 1943), English musician and one-time member of Strawbs
Walter Hooper (1931–2020), American writer
William Hooper (1742–1790), signer of the United States Declaration of Independence
Bella Hooper (born 2003)

Fictional characters
Matt Hooper, a marine biologist from the novel Jaws, and the subsequent Jaws (film) portrayed by Richard Dreyfuss
Molly Hooper, a character on the BBC TV show Sherlock
JP Hooper, a character on the BBC TV show Death in Paradise
Mr. Hooper, a character on the children's TV show Sesame Street
Hoppity Hooper, a cartoon character and namesake of the cartoon Hoppity Hooper
Edmund Hooper, a character in the novel called I'm the King of the Castle
Candice Hooper, a character in the film Final Destination 5

Occupational surnames
English-language surnames
English-language occupational surnames